The Field Elm cultivar Ulmus minor 'Hunnybunii' was originally identified as U. nitens var. Hunnybunii Moss by Moss in The Cambridge British Flora (1914). 'Hunnybunii' was reputed to have been commonly planted in the parklands and hedgerows of Essex, Cambridgeshire, and Huntingdonshire before the advent of Dutch elm disease. Melville considered the tree a hybrid of 'Coritana'.

The tree was named for C. E. Moss's collaborator, the botanical artist E. W. Hunnybun.

Description
Moss described 'Hunnybunii' as a taller tree than 'Sowerbyi', with the lower branches spreading at right angles, the upper less tortuous; leaves even more asymmetrical at the base, more acuminate at the apex. Samara and leaf drawings by E. W. Hunnybun appear in The Cambridge British Flora (1914).

Pests and diseases
Though susceptible to Dutch Elm Disease, field elms produce suckers and usually survive in this form in their area of origin.

Cultivation
Moss in The Cambridge British Flora (1914) described 'Hunnybunii' as "often planted, as in the grounds of St. John's College, Cambridge". Late 19th and early 20th century photographs of the St John's New Building lawn show elms matching the 'Hunnybunii' description. Herbarium specimens from The Hague and Wageningen suggest that the tree was cultivated in The Netherlands in the mid-20th century, possibly as part of the elm collection assembled there the 1930s for DED-testing by Christine Buisman, on behalf of the Dutch Elm Committee. No mature specimens are known to survive. Three surviving elms (2021), however, beside Dean Road, Bartlow, near the Cambridgeshire-Essex border, resemble var. 'Hunnybunii' in form. Their leaves appear close to the 1962 Wageningen specimen WAG.1852692 of U. carpinifolia 'Hunnybunnii'. Moss regarded the elm as a variety not a clone, allowing for some variability in leaf-shape.

Varieties
'Hunnybunii pseudo-Stricta'

References

External links
  Sheet labelled U. foliacea Gilibert var. hunnybunnii; leaves specimen, Cambridge
  Sheet labelled U. foliacea hunnybunnii; leaves specimen, Cambridge (Den Haag 1931)
  Sheet labelled U. nitens Hunnybunnii; twigs specimen, Cambridge (Den Haag 1931)
  Sheet labelled U. nitens var. Hunnybunnyi; samarae specimen, Cambridge, 1938
  Sheet labelled U. carpinifolia 'Hunnybunnii'; Wageningen specimen, 1962
  Sheet labelled U. carpinifolia 'Hunnybunnii'; Wageningen specimen, 1962
  Sheet labelled U. carpinifolia 'Hunnybunnii'; Wageningen specimen, 1962

Field elm cultivar
Ulmus articles with images
Ulmus